Ağaçyurdu is a village the central district (Karaman) of Karaman Province, Turkey. At  it is situated to the east of Turkish state highway . The population is of Ağaçyurdu is 128. as of 2011. Major economic activity of the village is agriculture. Main crops are citrus and apple. Dairying is a secondary activity.

References

Villages in Karaman Central District